The 1924 British Columbia general election was the sixteenth general election in the Province of British Columbia, Canada. It was held to elect members of the Legislative Assembly of British Columbia. The election was called on May 10, 1924, and held on June 20, 1924.  The new legislature met for the first time on November 3, 1924.

The Liberal Party was re-elected to its third term in government, falling just short of a majority in the legislature even though it won less than a third of the popular vote. Two Independent Liberals were also elected.  Premier John Oliver lost his own seat in Victoria City, but remained Premier until 1927.

The Conservative Party formed the official opposition, while two new parties, the Provincial Party and the Canadian Labour Party won three seats each, and a total of 35% of the vote.

Campaign
The Provincial Party, which nominated candidates only in 1924, was formed by a group of British Columbia Conservative Party dissidents known as the "Committee of 100", led and funded by the wealthy General Alexander McRae and political elements from the United Farmers of British Columbia. McRae claimed that the Liberal government of John Oliver and the previous administrations of Conservative Premier William John Bowser, then the opposition leader, were corrupt. Many of his allegations were related to the funding of the Pacific Great Eastern Railway plan to reach Prince George in the Northern interior of the province, which was not achieved until many years later. He claimed that there were kickbacks, patronage and various wrongdoings. His allegations were never proven. The election was bitterly fought with sensational allegations against all three leaders. McRae was not elected. Both Bowser and Oliver lost their seats but Oliver continued to lead his Liberal Party as Premier of a minority government after the election.

Results

Notes:

* Party did not nominate candidates in the previous election.

1 Not the same as the Canadian Labour Party of B.C. which contested the 1906 and 1909 general elections. Organized in British Columbia in 1924.

2 Includes joint Socialist Party of Canada - Workers' Party of Canada candidate.

Results by riding

|-
|-
||    
|align="center"  |Herbert Frederick Kergin
|align="center"  |AtlinLiberal
||    
||    
|align="center"  |Cowichan-NewcastleConservative
|align="center"  |Cyril Francis Davie
||    
|-
||    
|align="center"  |Edward Dodsley Barrow
|align="center"  |ChilliwackLiberal
||    
||    
|align="center"  |CranbrookConservative
|align="center"  |Noel Stirling Austin Arnold Wallinger
||    
|-
||    
|align="center"  |John Andrew Buckham
|align="center"  |ColumbiaLiberal
||    
||    
|align="center"  |CrestonConservative
|align="center"  |Fred W. Lister
||    
|-
||    
|align="center"|Alexander McDonald Paterson 
|align="center"  |DeltaLiberal
||    
||    
|align="center"  |DewdneyConservative
|align="center"  |John Alexander Catherwood
||    
|-
||    
|align="center"|James Reginald Colley 
|align="center"  |KamloopsLiberal
||    
||    
|align="center"  |EsquimaltConservative
|align="center"  |Robert Henry Pooley
||    
|-
||    
|align="center"|Henry George Thomas Perry 
|align="center"  |Fort GeorgeLiberal
||    
||    
|align="center"  |Grand Forks-GreenwoodConservative
|align="center"  |John McKie
||    
|-
||    
|align="center"|Charles Sidney Leary
|align="center"  |Kaslo-SlocanLiberal
||    
||    
|align="center"  |The IslandsConservative
|align="center"  |Cyrus Wesley Peck
||    
|-
||    
|align="center"|Albert Edward Munn
|align="center"  |LillooetLiberal
||    
||    
|align="center"  |MackenzieConservative
|align="center"  |Michael Manson
||    
|-
||    
|align="center"|William Sloan 
|align="center"  |Nanaimo
||    
||    
|align="center"  |Rossland-TrailConservative
|align="center"  |James Hargrave Schofield
||    
|-
||    
|align="center"|Kenneth Campbell
|align="center"  |Nelson
||    
||    
|align="center"  |SaanichConservative
|align="center"  |Thomas George Coventry
||    
|-
||    
|align="center"|Edwin James Rothwell
|align="center"  |New Westminster
||    
||    
|align="center"  |Salmon ArmConservative
|align="center"  |Rolf Wallgren Bruhn
||    
|-
||    
|align="center"|John Melvin Bryan, Sr.
|align="center"  |North VancouverLiberal
||    
||    
|align="center"  |SimilkameenConservative
|align="center"  |William Alexander McKenzie
||    
|-
||    
|align="center"|Alexander Malcolm Manson 
|align="center"  |OminecaLiberal
||    
||    
|align="center"  |South OkanaganConservative
|align="center"  |James William Jones
||    
|-
||    
|align="center"|Thomas Dufferin Pattullo 
|align="center"  |Prince RupertLiberal
||    
||    
|align="center" rowspan=4 |Victoria CityConservative
|align="center"  |Reginald Hayward
||    
|-
||    
|align="center"|William Henry Sutherland 
|align="center"  |RevelstokeLiberal
||    
||    
|align="center"  |Joshua Hinchcliffe
||    
|-
||    
|align="center"|Horace Cooper Wrinch 
|align="center"  |SkeenaLiberal
||    
||    
|align="center"  |Robert Allan Gus Lyons
||    
|-
||    
|align="center"|Ian Alistair MacKenzie 
|align="center" rowspan=5 |Vancouver CityLiberal
||    
||    
|align="center"  |Harold Despard Twigg
||    
|-
||    
|align="center"|Christopher McRae 
||    
||    
|align="center"  |CaribooProvincial
|align="center"  |David Alexander Stoddart
||    
|-
||    
|align="center"|Victor Wentworth Odlum 
||    
||    
|align="center"  |Richmond-Point GreyProvincial
|align="center"  |George Alexander Walkem
||    
|-
||    
|align="center"|Mary Ellen Smith 
||    
||    
|align="center"  |Vancouver CityProvincial
|align="center"  |Andrew McCreight Creery
||    
|-
||    
|align="center"|Charles Woodward 
||    
||    
|align="center"  |AlberniIndependent Liberal
|align="center"  |Richard John Burde
||    
|-
||    
|align="center"|John Duncan MacLean 
|align="center" |YaleLiberal
||    
||    
|align="center"  |ComoxIndependent Liberal
|align="center"  |Paul Philips Harrison
||    
|-
|
|
|
|
||    
|align="center"  |BurnabyCanadian Labour Party
|align="center"  |Francis Aubrey Browne
||    
|-
|
|
|
|
||    
|align="center"  |FernieCanadian Labour Party
|align="center"  |Thomas Aubert Uphill
||    
|-
|
|
|
|
||    
|align="center"  |South VancouverCanadian Labour Party
|align="center"  |Robert Henry Neelands
||    
|-
|-
|
|align="center"|
|
|-
| align="center" colspan="10"|Source: Elections BC
|-
|}

See also
List of British Columbia political parties

References

Further reading 

In the Sea of Sterile Mountains: The Chinese in British Columbia, Joseph Morton, J.J. Douglas, Vancouver (1974).  Despite its title, a fairly thorough account of the politicians and electoral politics in early BC.
 

1924
1924 elections in Canada
1924 in British Columbia
June 1924 events